Stegman is a surname. Notable people with the surname include:

David William Stegman (born 1954), outfielder for the Detroit Tigers
Lewis R. Stegman, Colonel in the US Civil War
Maritta Martin Wolff Stegman (1918–2002), American author
Ryan Stegman, American comic book artist
Trevor Robert Stegman (born 1946), rugby union player

See also
Stegmann